Hafiz Mohd. Siddiq (1940  13 March 2012) was an Indian politician and member of parliament. He served as a member of the 8th Lok Sabha (198489) from Moradabad parliamentary constituency. Prior to participating in Lok Sabha elections, he served as a minister of State for Revenue after electing to Uttar Pradesh Legislative Assembly (198084). He was affiliated with the Indian National Congress.

Biography 
He was born to Haji Mohd. Ibrahim in 1940 at Moradabad, Uttar Pradesh. He did his matriculation from Muslim Inter Collage, Moradabad, and later he was appointed a member of Managing Committee, in addition to Muslim Inter College, Moradabad.

He was married to Shamim Fatima, with whom he had six children, including three daughters and three sons.

Beferences 

1940 births
2012 deaths
Place of death missing
India MPs 1984–1989
Uttar Pradesh MLAs 1980–1985
Politicians from Moradabad
Indian National Congress politicians from Uttar Pradesh